The 2016 MXGP of Qatar was the first round of the 2016 FIM Motocross World Championship season. It was held at the Losail International Circuit in Lusail, Qatar on 26-27 February 2016 and included the first rounds of the 2016 MXGP and MX2 world championships, along with the first round of the 2016 FIM Women's Motocross World Championship. Romain Febvre was the reigning MXGP world champion, after taking his first title in 2015.

Entry Lists
The entry lists for the 2016 MXGP of Qatar were announced on 12 January 2016.

Entry List

MXGP Entry List

1 Ken De Dycker did not ride due to a broken femur sustained in pre-season training.

2 Matiss Karro did not ride due to a torn left ACL sustained in a pre-season race.

3 Jordi Tixier did not ride due to an operation needed on his already injured wrist.

4 Rui Gonçalves did not ride due to a serious finger injury picked up at a pre-season race.

MX2 Entry List

1 Julien Lieber did not ride due to ongoing hip problems.

2 Alvin Östlund made his Grand Prix debut to replace Lieber.

WMX Entry List

MXGP

MXGP Practice Times

Free Practice

1 Clement Desalle is riding the grand prix with a broken arm that he sustained at a pre-season race.

MXGP Timed Practice

MXGP Qualifying Race

MXGP Races

Race 1

1 2015 MX2 world champion Tim Gajser won his first MXGP class race on his MXGP debut.

Race 2

1 Tim Gajser took his first MXGP class double race win on his MXGP debut.

2 Gautier Paulin retired with a mechanical problem on the first lap.

MXGP of Qatar Overall

1Tim Gajser took his first MXGP class overall on his debut in the class.

MX2

MX2 Practice Times

Free Practice

MX2 Timed Practice

1 Adam Sterry did not take further part in the Grand Prix due to a wrist injury picked up in timed practice.

MX2 Qualifying Race

1 Calvin Vlaanderen did not take any further part in the Grand Prix after aggravating an ankle injury in timed practice.

2 Alfie Smith did not take any further part in the Grand Prix after picking up an injury in practice.

MX2 Races

Race 1

1 Davy Pootjes broke his collarbone in this race and did not take part in the second race.

Race 2

MX2 Grand Prix Overall

WMX

WMX Practice Times

Free Practice

MXW Timed Practice

WMX Races

Race 1

1Courtney Duncan won her first WMX race on her debut at world championship level.

Race 2

1Courtney Duncan took her first double race win on her world championship debut.

WMX Grand Prix Overall

1Courtney Duncan won her first WMX overall grand prix on her debut in the world championship.

References

Qatar
MXGP